is a professional Japanese baseball player. He plays pitcher for the Tokyo Yakult Swallows.

References 

2001 births
Living people
Baseball people from Ishikawa Prefecture
Japanese baseball players
Nippon Professional Baseball pitchers
Tokyo Yakult Swallows players